Sant'Ilario dello Ionio is a local municipality in the Province of Reggio Calabria in the Italian region Calabria, located about  southwest of Catanzaro and about  east of Reggio Calabria.

Sant'Ilario dello Ionio borders the following municipalities: Antonimina, Ardore, Ciminà, Locri, Portigliola.
Three different communities are found in this municipality: the ancient borgo di Condojanni, Sant'Ilario centro and la Marina. In the municipality act a  Youth municipality committee  an autonomous organism based on an open and informal model of free youth participation recognized in the statute of the municipality and supported by European Commission.

Demographic evolution

References

Cities and towns in Calabria